John Edward Belcher (20 February 1834 – 20 August 1915) was an Irish-born Canadian civil engineer and architect. He is most known for his work in Peterborough, Ontario, where he designed many churches, residences and civic buildings which are now local landmarks. Belcher served as president of the Ontario Association of Architects in 1899.

Biography
John Edward Belcher was born on 20 February 1834 in Cork, Ireland. He was educated at Queen's College Cork, and articled with his father, Samuel R. Belcher, who was also an architect. Belcher apprenticed with John Benson before emigrating to British North America in 1858.

Upon settling in Peterborough, Ontario, Belcher became civic engineer for the County and later Town of Peterborough. He was responsible for a number of civic improvements and public works projects. Most notably, the Market Hall, completed in 1890.

He built a number of Anglican, Methodist and Presbyterian churches in Peterborough and its surrounding area. In 1885, Belcher was appointed diocesan architect by the newly formed Roman Catholic Diocese of Peterborough. In this role, he expanded and renovated the Cathedral of St. Peter-in-Chains and built parish churches in Peterborough, Cobourg and Douro.

Belcher married Clementina MacDonald in 1842 and they had four children. He died in Peterborough on 20 August 1915 and is buried in Little Lake Cemetery.

Notable works
 St. Luke's Church, Ashburnham, Ontario, 1877 (gutted by fire 1959)
 Morrow Building, Peterborough, Ontario, 1879
 St. John the Evangelist Church (chancel and parish hall), Peterborough, Ontario, 1879–82 
 Cathedral of St. Peter-in-Chains (sacristy and renovations), Peterborough, Ontario, 1884–85
 Market Hall, Peterborough, Ontario, 1889–90
 All Saints Church, Peterborough, Ontario, 1890–91 
 Canadian Bank of Commerce, Peterborough, Ontario, 1892
 Pagoda Bridge, Jackson Park, Peterborough, Ontario, 1895 
 Peterborough Collegiate, 1907 
 Sacred Heart Church, Peterborough, Ontario, 1907–09
 Peterborough Public Library, Peterborough, Ontario, 1910–11, with William Blackwell (now part of Peterborough City Hall)

Gallery

References

1834 births
1915 deaths
People from Cork (city)
Irish emigrants to Canada (before 1923)
Alumni of Queens College Cork
19th-century Canadian architects
20th-century Canadian architects
Canadian ecclesiastical architects